Pod banderą miłości (Under the Flag of Love) is a 1929 Polish romance film directed by Michał Waszyński.

Cast
Zbigniew Sawan ...  Andrzej 
Jerzy Marr ...  Jerzy Rzecki 
Paweł Owerłło ...  Komandor 
Maria Bogda ...  Maria 
Jadwiga Boryta ...  Kobieta-szpieg (as Jaga Boryta) 
Władysław Walter ...  Marynarz 
Leonard Zajączkowski ...  Marynarz (as Leon Zajączkowski) 
Tekla Trapszo ...  Andrzej's mother 
Jerzy Kobusz ...  Kadet szkoły morskiej 
Tadeusz Fijewski ...  Kadet Szkoły Morskiej

External links 
 

1929 films
Polish black-and-white films
Films directed by Michał Waszyński
Polish silent films
1929 romance films
Polish romance films